Jelt Sietsema (May 7, 1921January 29, 2005) was a Democratic member of the Michigan House of Representatives, representing part of Kent County from 1969 through 1986.

Early life
A native of Grand Rapids, Sietsema was a veteran of World War II serving in the European Theater. He attended Radio Electronics Television School, and married Betty Jean Eastman in 1948.

Political career
Sietsema won election to the House in 1968, defeating the incumbent Johannes Kolderman. He went on to serve nine terms. While in the House, Sietsema sponsored legislation requiring curbs to be cut to accommodate wheelchairs.

Along with 14 colleagues, he drew the ire of his caucus in the early 1980s over cutting workers' compensation rates.

Sietsema was defeated for re-election in 1986 by Ken Sikkema.

Later life
After leaving the House, Sietsema won election to the Kent County Board of Commissioners where he served four terms.

Sietsema died on January 29, 2005, aged 83.

References

1921 births
2005 deaths
Politicians from Grand Rapids, Michigan
Democratic Party members of the Michigan House of Representatives
Military personnel from Michigan
United States Army personnel of World War II
County commissioners in Michigan
20th-century American politicians